The following is a list of tours by the Jonas Brothers.

American Club Tour

The American Club Tour was the debut concert tour of American boy band Jonas Brothers, launched in support of their debut album, It's About Time. Most of the tour was held in clubs and very small venues, as the band was not very well known at the time; relating with the equally young artist, Jen Marks. The tour began on January 28, 2006, in Roseville, and ended on March 3, 2006, in Orlando; comprising 28 dates.

Set list
 "Mandy"
 "Time for Me to Fly"
 "Underdog"
 "One Day at a Time"
 "7:05"

Tour dates

Marvelous Party Tour 

The Marvelous Party Tour (often called the "Prom Tour") was the second concert tour of American boy band Jonas Brothers, launched to promote their second album, Jonas Brothers. The tour contained decorations such as photo booths to add realism to the prom theme. It began on June 25, 2007, and ended on October 21, 2007. It lasted for a total of 46 dates, making it their third longest tour.

Set list 

 "Kids of the Future"
 "Mandy"
 "Just Friends"
 "Goodnight And Goodbye"
 "Hello Beautiful"
 "Australia"
 "What I Go to School For"
 "That's Just The Way We Roll"
 "Hollywood"
 "Inseparable"
 "Still in Love With You"
 "Hold On"
 "S.O.S."
 "Year 3000"

Tour dates

When You Look Me in the Eyes Tour 

The When You Look Me in the Eyes Tour (or the Look Me in the Eyes Tour), sometimes stylized as the WYLMITE Tour, is the fourth tour by the Jonas Brothers and their second tour to promote their self-titled studio album. It started on January 31, 2008 and ended on March 22, 2008.

The Burning Up Tour

World Tour 2009 

The Jonas Brothers World Tour 2009 was the sixth concert tour and third headlining tour by the Jonas Brothers, promoting their fourth studio album Lines, Vines and Trying Times. It began on May 18, 2009, in Lima, Peru and ended on December 13, 2009, in San Juan, Puerto Rico.

Live in Concert 

The Jonas Brothers: Live in Concert is the seventh concert tour by American pop rock band, the Jonas Brothers to promote on their fourth studio album Lines, Vines and Trying Times and the soundtrack to their Disney Channel show Jonas. The tour started on August 7, 2010, in Tinley Park, Illinois and ended on November 13, 2010, in Buenos Aires, Argentina. The tour included cities in the United States, Canada, the Caribbean, Mexico, Central America and South America. The brothers were accompanied by Demi Lovato and the cast of Camp Rock 2: The Final Jam to promote their albums Here We Go Again and Camp Rock 2: The Final Jam respectively.

Background 

While announcing Nick Jonas' side-project Nick Jonas and the Administration, the Jonas Brothers announced they were planning a world tour to take place during the summer of 2010.

On April 27, 2010, the band and Lovato officially announced the tour, through their official websites and MySpace pages. The tour featured the band with special guests Lovato and their friends and co-stars from Camp Rock and Camp Rock 2: The Final Jam. The tour included both songs by the band and songs from the films. The pop group Savvy performed as a supporting act on select dates. The brothers set list also included songs from the soundtrack to their Disney Channel Original Series, Jonas.

The tour began on August 7, 2010, in Illinois. It was originally supposed to begin on July 27, 2010, in Dallas, but was moved back, due to changes in their schedule. Unlike the previous tour, the Jonas Brothers Live in Concert had a simple yet complex stage design. The stage consisted of multiple vertical moving screens that displayed different images or graphics while the brothers played. This concert was not in the round and played mostly in amphitheaters across the country and around the world.

Some of these tour dates have been canceled and changed. The tour started on August 6, 2010, two weeks later than planned, which allowed Nick Jonas to perform in the West End production of Les Misérables as Marius Pontmercy in London. The Tampa, Florida tour was cancelled due to flash flooding at Tampa's 1-800-ASK-GARY Amphitheater. The San Nicolás, Mexico tour was also cancelled. Both shows were not rescheduled.

On November 1, 2010, Demi Lovato was dropped out of the tour after a dispute arose to the public light involving them apparently punching one of the dancers of the tour. After Lovato left, they were interned in a treatment center to seek out help and the tour continued without them until its last show.

Road Dogs 

For the second year in a row, the Jonas Brothers held several softball games with their team the "Road Dogs" throughout the tour. The games were part of the "X the TXT" campaign which brings awareness to the dangers of texting while driving. "We’re a part of the "X the Text" campaign with our sponsor Allstate, which is an amazing thing. So many teen drivers and drivers out there have accidents texting while driving, and it's such a [great] thing to bring awareness to this", told Kevin Jonas to MTV.

Set list 

 "Feelin' Alive"
 "Hold On"
 "Year 3000"
 "Play My Music"
 "Heart & Soul"
 "Introducing Me" (Nick Jonas solo)
 "Gotta Find You"
 "This is Me" / "Wouldn't Change a Thing" / "This Is Our Song" (with Demi Lovato)
 "L.A. Baby (Where Dreams Are Made Of)
 "Drive My Car"
 "Paranoid"
 "Who I Am"
 "Fly With Me"
 "When You Look Me in the Eyes"
 "Please Be Mine"
 "Lovebug"
 "S.O.S"
 "Burnin' Up"

Notes
 On August 22, 2010, due to inclement weather, the band did not perform "Drive My Car".
 On August 28, 2010, Nick Jonas performed "Rose Garden" in Atlantic City. 
 Nick Jonas performed "Stay" during the concert in Virginia Beach. 
 On September 18, 2010, Nick Jonas performed "Who I Am" and "Last Time Around".

Tour dates 

Cancellations

Box office score data

Jonas Brothers World Tour 2012/2013

The Jonas Brothers World Tour 2012/2013 is the eighth concert tour by the Jonas Brothers, which promoted their originally-planned fifth studio album V that was ultimately cancelled. Three new songs from the original project were performed on the tour: "Let's Go", "Wedding Bells" and "First Time".

Opening Act
 Anna Maria Perez de Tagle (Asia) 
 Mikey Deleasa (South America)

Setlists

Tour dates

Festivals and other miscellaneous performances
These concert is a part of the Jingle Ball
These concert is a part of the National School Choice Week's official Kickoff Celebration
These concert is a part of the Festival Internacional de la Canción de Viña del Mar

Box office score data

Jonas Brothers Live 

The Jonas Brothers Live is the ninth concert tour by American pop/rock band, the Jonas Brothers before their split on October 29, 2013. This tour included cities in the United States and Canada to promote their unreleased album V after their fourth studio album Lines, Vines and Trying Times (2009). On October 9, 2013, the group cancelled their highly anticipated comeback tour days before it was slated to start, citing a "deep rift within the band" over "creative differences", later announcing their break-up as a band on October 29, 2013. After their split, the band released their second live album after the tour ended, which is composed of live performances from their Los Angeles and Uncasville shows and five original studio recordings that would've been on V.

Support acts
 Karmin (North America; July 10 – August 16) 
 Olivia Somerlyn (San Francisco, San Diego, Los Angeles) 
 Bonnie McKee (North America; October 11 – November 6) (Cancelled)

Setlist
The following set list is representative of the show on July 10, 2013. It is not representative of all concerts for the duration of the tour.

 "First Time"
 "Paranoid"
 "Pom Poms"
 "Found" (new song)
 "Who I Am" 
 "That's Just the Way We Roll"
 "Make It Right"
 "Before the Storm"
 "The World (new song)
 "Fly with Me"
 "Wedding Bells"
 "See No More" (Joe Jonas cover)
 "What Do I Mean to You" (new song)
 "Still in Love with You"
 "Last Time Around"
 "Don't Say" (new song)
 "Hello Beautiful" (audience pick)
 "When You Look Me in the Eyes"
 "Burnin' Up"
 "Gotta Find You"
 "Lovebug"
 "S.O.S"

Tour dates

Festivals and other miscellaneous performances
These concert is a part of the Acapulco Festival
These concert is a part of Live Music Day Festival
These concert is a part of Red Hot & Boom 
These concert is a part of the Mixtape Festival
These concert is a part of Concert of Kidd's Kids 
These concert is a part of the We Day Toronto
These concert is a part of the We Day Minneapolis

Cancelled shows

Happiness Begins Tour 

The Happiness Begins Tour was the tenth concert tour by the Jonas Brothers, in promotion of their fifth studio album, Happiness Begins, and their first one since reuniting after their 2013 separation. The tour began on August 7, 2019, in Miami, Florida at the American Airlines Arena and concluded on February 22, 2020, in Paris, France at the AccorHotels Arena.

Remember This Tour 

The Remember This Tour was the eleventh concert tour by the Jonas Brothers. The tour began in Las Vegas at the Park Theater and concluded in Los Angeles at the Hollywood Bowl.

Background 
On May 18, 2021, the band first teased a video on social media where they are calling Kelsea Ballerini via FaceTime, hinting an announcement. On the same day, a couple venues started posting pictures of their marquees on their social media reading "Remember This" and a scheduled date for the tour. On May 19, 2021, the full tour was announced, consisting of 44 dates.

Setlist 
The following setlist is representative of August 20, in Las Vegas and does not represent the entire duration of the tour
 "Remember This"
 "Only Human"
 "What a Man Gotta Do"
 "Leave Before You Love Me"
 "Cool"
 "Burnin Up"
 "Lonely"
 "Cake by the Ocean" 
 "Toothbrush"
 "S.O.S."
 "Hold On"
 "Fly With Me"
 "Lovebug"
 "Mercy"
 "Close"
 "Jealous" 
 "Strangers"
 "Paranoid"
 "Shelf" 
 "Year 3000"
 "Sucker"

Tour dates

Promotional tours

Fall Tour

The Fall Tour was the Jonas Brothers first tour, to promote their debut album It's About Time. It began on November 5, 2005, and ended on December 17, 2005. The tour also became a part of The Cheetah-licious Christmas Tour, as the Jonas Brothers were surprise guests who opened for both The Cheetah Girls and Aly & AJ for a total of 10 dates, while on this tour.

Tour dates

Road Dogs tour
The band held several softball games with their team the Road Dogs throughout their 2010 world tour, part of the "X the TXT" campaign, raising awareness of the dangers of texting while driving.

Tour dates

As opening act

Cheetah-licious Christmas Tour (The Cheetah Girls)

Never Gone Tour (Backstreet Boys)

The Veronicas 2006 US Tour

Best of Both Worlds Tour (Hannah Montana/Miley Cyrus)

The Best Damn World Tour (Avril Lavigne)

Notes

References

Lists of concert tours